A nāḥiyah (plural nawāḥī  ), also nahiya or nahia, is a regional or local type of administrative division that usually consists of a number of villages or sometimes smaller towns. In Tajikistan, it is a second-level division while in Syria, Iraq, Lebanon, Jordan, Xinjiang, and the former Ottoman Empire, where it was also called a bucak, it is a third-level or lower division. It can constitute a division of a qadaa, mintaqah or other such district-type division and is sometimes translated as "subdistrict".

Ottoman Empire 

Examples

Arabic-speaking countries

Turkic-speaking territories
 Xinjiang, China: a subdivision of a prefectural.

Other
 Districts of Tajikistan: a subdivision of a province.

References

Types of administrative division
Arabic words and phrases
Subdivisions of the Ottoman Empire
Former types of subdivisions of Bosnia and Herzegovina
Former types of subdivisions of Serbia